The 2009 AMA Pro Racing Championship season consisted of the American Motorcyclist Association's professional motorcycle racing series:

2009 AMA Pro American Superbike Championship season
2009 AMA Pro Daytona Sportbike Championship season
2009 AMA Pro Supersport Championship season

American Motorcyclist Association
AMA Pro Racing